Wichelstowe is a residential development and urban extension on the southern edge of the town of Swindon in South West England, constructed from late 2006. Located north of the M4 motorway between junction 16 and Croft Road, Wichelstowe has three neighbourhoods: East, Middle and West Wichel. The development will comprise up to 4500 homes, employment space, public open space, shopping, community facilities for residents and various schools. In 2014 it was described as the country's largest housing project on public-owned land.

History
The medieval history of the site is reflected in the name; 'Wichel' is the original name of the area as recorded in the Domesday Book of 1086, and 'stowe' is an Old English word meaning "meeting place".

Before the Wichelstowe development was built, the area was commonly known as the 'front garden' of Swindon since it was a stretch of open land which separated the town from the motorway.

In 1995, the first proposals for the site were put forward for consideration by Wiltshire County Council as structure planning authority. The following year, the first public proposal for the site considered a comprehensive development to help meet Swindon's housing needs up to 2011.

In 2001, the Front Garden Action Group (FRAG) and Bloor Homes launched an unsuccessful High Court challenge against the Structure Plan and the green light was effectively given for Wichelstowe to go ahead. An extensive programme of public consultation was undertaken on the proposals by Taylor Woodrow and an outline planning application was submitted in 2002. Infrastructure works commenced on site in 2006. The first home occupations in East Wichel took place in 2009.

Development
Wichelstowe began as a collaboration between Swindon Borough Council and Taylor Wimpey to jointly provide and finance infrastructure. In early 2009, this agreement was reshaped into a co-operation agreement; both parties operated independently but in a mutually supportive way to develop the site. The entire Wichelstowe development was due to be completed by 2020, but this was delayed by the financial crisis of 2008.

East Wichel

East Wichel, the eastern quarter, was largely built by Taylor Wimpey who operated independently with support from Swindon Borough Council. Construction started in 2008, and the development was completed in 2014.
Construction was by Taylor Wimpey, Barratt, David Wilson Homes, Persimmon plc, and Bloor Homes.
The first home in East Wichel was occupied in April 2009.
In 2010, Thamesdown Transport (now Swindon's Bus Company) amended their bus route 11 to serve the new development.
A small reservoir, Wichelstowe Lakes, was built between 2010 and 2011.
East Wichel Community Primary School opened to pupils in September 2011.
The new restored canal was completed in 2011. 
A Marston's pub/restaurant called The Bayberry opened in May 2012. The Bayberry was rebranded as The Wichel Inn in November 2021.
In early 2019, a new Co-op store opened in East Wichel; a fish and chip shop, a dentist, a Brazilian restaurant and a hair salon opened the following year.
In 2019, the canal began to experience some problems with water leaking; the problem is currently being investigated and temporary concrete barriers have been set-up in an attempt to remedy the issue.
In 2020, a small add-on called Ambrose Gardens was built adjacent to Croft Road.
A playground in East Wichel was constructed in 2015; it underwent a major revamp in late 2020.

Middle Wichel
Middle Wichel is the central part of Wichelstowe. A restored section of the Wilts & Berks Canal runs through the development. Construction started in 2013, and currently still ongoing.

Road infrastructure, including a new bridge, was built between 2007 and 2010, and opened in 2011.
A Waitrose supermarket opened its doors to the public in April 2014.
A pub/restaurant operated by Hall & Woodhouse opened in late 2018.
The Deanery Academy, a new secondary school, had its first intake of pupils in September 2019.
Work started on the Canalside housing development in late 2019; the first occupations in Middle Wichel took place in 2020, and the development was completed in 2021.
The Kingfisher Academy, a new primary school next to the Deanery, was opened in September 2021.
Work started on Wichel Fields, a new housing development to the east of Waitrose, in mid 2021.
In April 2021, Mill Lane closed to through traffic and became a public cycle path & footpath, maintaining vehicular access only from one end.
A new roundabout at the southern end of Mill Lane was built between late 2021 and early 2022, to prepare for new roads linking Wichel Fields and surrounding areas.

West Wichel

West Wichel is planned to be a mostly residential area, but it is also set to contain a small area for shops, employment land, another primary school and a park & ride. Work commenced on the first sections of West Wichel in 2022. The area for the development is adjacent to the hamlet of South Leaze.

A new M4 underpass road linking Wichelstowe to Wharf Road was completed in 2022, but will remain closed to the public until the Scott Way extention is completed.
A new roundabout at the Wharf Road / Hay Lane junction opened in November 2021 to connect with the new road.
Work started on The Orchards — the first section of West Wichel — in 2022.

Governance
East Wichel is part of Central Swindon South civil parish, and the first tier of local government is South Swindon Parish Council.  Middle and West Wichel are part of Wroughton civil parish, and the first tier of local government is Wroughton Parish Council.

The local authority is Swindon Borough Council, a unitary authority. Wichelstowe forms part of the council's South Locality, alongside Old Town, Wroughton, Chiseldon and Lawn, and Ridgeway wards.

References

External links
 
Wichelstowe Website

Borough of Swindon